You Are Not I is a 1981 American drama film directed by Sara Driver and starring Suzanne Fletcher, Evelyn Smith, and Lucy Sante. The film is based on the 1948 short story of the same name by Paul Bowles.

Summary
Adapted from a Paul Bowles story, a young mentally disturbed woman named Ethel escapes from the asylum where she is treated until she is mistaken for one of the survivors of a deadly car accident she stumbled upon. Then she is taken to her sister's home.

Production
The film was shot in six days for $12,000 as a thesis film for New York University.

It played widely at international film festivals, but a leak at a New Jersey warehouse destroyed the negative leaving Driver with a battered unprojectable copy. It was thought to have been lost, until a print was found at the holdings of Bowles.

Rediscovery
It has since been released on the DVD set "Driver X4: The Lost and Found Films of Sara Driver".

References

External links
 
Film of Paul Bowles Short Story Rediscovered on The New York Times

1981 films
1980s English-language films
American drama films
Films based on American short stories
Rediscovered American films
Films directed by Sara Driver
1981 drama films
1980s rediscovered films
1980s American films